Andrei Vladimirovich Ivanov (born 4 January 1972) is a Russian professional football coach and a former player.

Club career
He played 3 seasons in the Russian Football National League for FC Oryol.

References

1972 births
Sportspeople from Oryol
Living people
Russian footballers
Association football goalkeepers
FC Oryol players
Russian football managers